Major General Channa Weerasuriya RWP, RSP, ndu is a senior Sri Lanka Army officer. He is the incumbent Chief of Staff of the Army. Earlier, he served as Deputy Chief of Staff of Sri Lanka Army (DCOS). Prior to join DCOS, he served as the Commandant of Sri Lanka Army Volunteer Force and before this appointment he had served as Commander, Security Forces - East and General Officer Commanding(GOC), 22 Infantry Division.

Early life and education 
After completed Higher Secondary education at Mahanama College, Kollupitiya he joined Sri Lanka Army as an officer cadet on 27 October 1986 to the Intake 26 and was commissioned as a Second Lieutenant into the 1st Battalion of the Sri Lanka Light Infantry on 23 July 1987.

Military career 
Being the officer of Sri Lanka infantry he successfully commanded 4th Battalion of Sri Lanka Light Infantry Regiment which was always on front line combat during Sri Lankan civil war. He was the Commander of 512, 523 and 663 Infantry Brigades, Commander of Air Mobile Brigade and Commander of 22 Division in Trincomalee. Weerasuriya is also the Colonel of the Regiment of Sri Lanka Light Infantry.

Family 
General Weerasuriya happily married to Mrs. Danusha Weerasuriya and blessed with a daughter.

References 

Sri Lankan major generals
Sinhalese military personnel
Sri Lanka Light Infantry officers
1968 births
Living people
People from Colombo District